He Would a Hunting Go is a 1913 American short comedy film directed by George Nichols and starring Fatty Arbuckle.

Cast
 Roscoe 'Fatty' Arbuckle
 Alice Davenport
 Billy Gilbert (as Little Billy Gilbert)
 Grover Ligon
 Hank Mann
 Harry McCoy
 Al St. John

See also
 Fatty Arbuckle filmography
 List of American films of 1913

References

External links

1913 films
1913 comedy films
1913 short films
American silent short films
American black-and-white films
Films directed by George Nichols
Silent American comedy films
American comedy short films
1910s American films